Noonday may refer to:

Places
Noonday, Georgia
Noonday Creek, Georgia
Noonday, Texas

People
 Noahquageshik, a 19th Century Native American leader often referred to as Chief Noonday

Media
Noonday (novel), by Pat Barker, published in 2015
Noonday Paperbacks, a former imprint of Farrar, Straus and Giroux
Noonday, a magazine in book form, three annual issues published, 1958-1960, edited by Cecil Hemley, and in its latter two issues, also by Dwight W. Webb. Published many notable writers, including the first English translation of The Last Summer by Boris Pasternak in the first issue.

See also
Noon (disambiguation)